Péter Pölöskei (born 11 August 1988, in Budapest) is a Hungarian football player.

Career
After leaving Ferencvárosi TC, Poloskei joined Coventry City on trial during August 2012, where he played in Coventry's pre season. However, after considering offering Poloskei a one-year deal, Coventry decided not to offer Poloskei a full-time contract.

After his trial ended at Coventry, Poloskei joined Leeds United on trial in September 2012, and scored on his début for the club in Leeds Development Team's 3–1 victory over Wigan Athletic. His ex Ferencvárosi TC Manager Bobby Davison tipped Poloskei to be a hit at Leeds United should he get a permanent deal.
He currently plays for Debreceni VSC

In August 2019, Pölöskei joined Soroksár SC. On 8 January 2020 the club announced, that he had left the club. Pölöskei had suffered from several injuries and only managed to play 10 games in total, scoring two goals for the club.

References

External links

Player profile at HLSZ 

1988 births
Living people
Footballers from Budapest
Hungarian footballers
Association football forwards
BKV Előre SC footballers
Szombathelyi Haladás footballers
Ferencvárosi TC footballers
Rákospalotai EAC footballers
Debreceni VSC players
Pécsi MFC players
Nyíregyháza Spartacus FC players
Soroksár SC players
Nemzeti Bajnokság I players
Nemzeti Bajnokság II players